Einavatnet is a lake which lies in Vestre Toten Municipality in Innlandet county, Norway. The village of Eina lies at the northern end of the lake. The Eina Church is located on the eastern shore of the lake. The Norwegian National Road 4 runs along the eastern shore of the lake. The river Hunnselva flows north out of the lake towards the town of Gjøvik where it drains into the large lake Mjøsa.

Name
The Old Norse form of the name was probably just Eini. This name is derived from einir which means "juniper" (referring to the vegetation around the lake). The last element of the name is -vatnet which is the finite form of vatn which means "water" or "lake". Historically, the lake name only included the first element of the current name, and later the -vatnet suffix was added.

See also
List of lakes in Norway

References

Vestre Toten
Lakes of Innlandet